Jazzateers were a Scottish underground pop/post-punk group, formed in 1980, who recorded for Postcard Records, Rough Trade Records, and have had compilation CDs released by Marina Records and Cherry Red Records. Jazzateers catalogue covering their archive from Postcard, Rough Trade and beyond are available on vinyl via The Creeping Bent Organisation.  The group was formed by songwriters Ian Burgoyne and Keith Band.

History
The band's early lineup consisted of Burgoyne, Band, singer Alison Gourlay and drummer Colin Auld. One of the early Jazzateers recordings with Gourlay on vocals, "Blue Moon Over Hawaii", was later included on the Messthetics series of compilations.

Jazzateers were an underground pop group from Glasgow who were active for the first half of the 1980s during the 'Sound of Young Scotland' period. Jazzateers were signed to Postcard Records and managed during this period by label boss Alan Horne. Jazzateers were also the final scheduled release of the Postcard catalogue (81-14) with their Edwyn Collins-produced cover of a Donna Summer song, "Wasted". However, consistent with Jazzateers inconsistent career trajectory, the single wasn't released, as Postcard Records ceased activity. Alan Horne then produced a Jazzateers album, 'Lee,' which also remains unreleased.

After the demise of Postcard, Jazzateers followed labelmates The Go-Betweens and Aztec Camera by signing to Rough Trade Records, finally releasing an eponymously-titled debut album in 1983. The album was a critical and commercial success, but true to Jazzateers contrary spirit, they put the Jazzateers brand on hold and transmogrified into Bourgie Bourgie, signing a major label deal. Bourgie Bourgie recorded an album (unreleased) and split up after a couple of singles.

Jazzateers were reactivated after Bourgie Bourgie split, with new vocalist Matt Willcock joining and taking over lyrical input. Prior to Willcock joining, the songs had been written by Jazzateers core members, Ian Burgoyne and Keith Band, and sung by various vocalists (Alison Gourlay, the Rutkowski Sisters, Grahame Skinner, Paul Quinn). However the injection of new blood provided by Willcock and lead guitarist Mick Slaven, created the perfect environment for Jazzateers to finally hit their peak flow. Slaven's Tom Verlaine / Robert Quine influences took centre stage in the group, along with Willcock's poetic lyrical approach.

The Blood is Sweeter Than Honey recording sessions found Jazzateers developing an approach akin to Destiny Street and Adventure (the sophomore albums by Richard Hell & the Voidoids and Television) respectively. A single ("Pressing On") was released to acclaim, garnering Single of the Week plaudits in the music press, which coincided with Jazzateers promoting the release by touring the UK as special guests of Lloyd Cole and the Commotions. However, Jazzateers errant history was repeated when the attendant album (Blood is Sweeter Than Honey), was shelved, and the group fractured shortly thereafter.

Blood Is Sweeter Than Honey was released for the first time via the Creeping Bent Organisation and is available in deluxe gatefold 180g vinyl and download editions.

Much of the band's unreleased Postcard-era recordings were released in August 2014 by Cherry Red Records / Creeping Bent on the album Don't Let Your Son Grow Up To Be A Cowboy: Unreleased Recordings.

Lineups

The band has gone through several lineup changes from 1980 to 1986:
Jazzateers v1 (1980–1981)

Alison Gourlay (vocals)
Ian Burgoyne (guitar)
Keith Band (bass)
Colin Auld (drums)

Don't Let Your Son Grow Up To Be A Cowboy

Some tracks were produced by Edwyn Collins, including a version of Donna Summers' "Wasted" which was scheduled to be a single on Postcard. Another (unreleased) version of "Wasted" was produced by Pete Bellote.

Jazzateers v2 (1982)

Dee Rutkowski (vocals)
Louise Rutkowski (vocals)

Paul Quinn (vocals)
Ian Burgoyne (guitar, vocals)
Keith Band (bass)
Colin Auld (drums)

Jazzateers 2 recorded an album ('Lee') produced by Alan Horne which has yet to be released.

Jazzateers v3 (1983)

Grahame Skinner (vocals)
Ian Burgoyne (guitar)
Keith Band (bass)
Colin Auld (drums)

Paul Quinn (backing vocals)

Jazzateers 3 signed to Rough Trade.

"Show Me The Door"/"16 Reasons" was released as a single swiftly followed by the eponymously titled album, which received excellent reviews. Shortly afterwards, they were joined by Mick Slaven on lead guitar with Paul Quinn taking over on lead vocals. They reverted to the name Bourgie Bourgie, whilst Skinner started a new group with Douglas MacIntyre called White Savages.  Jazzateers had been booked to appear on a UK television show, The Switch on back of the press acclaim the group were getting for their Rough Trade album. Instead they appeared on The Switch as Bourgie Bourgie (performing "Show Me The Door" and "16 Reasons"), and shortly afterwards were being courted by several major labels in the UK. Bourgie Bourgie eventually signed to MCA (with Kenny MacDonald replacing Colin Auld on drums) and released two singles, "Breaking Point" and "Careless". An album was also recorded, but unreleased.

Rough 46

Jazzateers v4 (1985-1986)

Matt Willcock (vocals)
Ian Burgoyne (guitar, keyboards)
Keith Band (bass)
Mick Slaven (guitar)
Douglas MacIntyre (guitar)

Stephen Lironi (drums, keyboards)

Andy Harrold (drums)

Skip Reid (drums)
Barry Aitchison (drums)

Jazzateers 4 released a single ("Pressing On") for the Stampede label and undertook a UK tour supporting Lloyd Cole & The Commotions.

Discography

Albums
Jazzateers a.k.a. Rough 46 (1983), Rough Trade - UK Indie No. 14, reissued in 2013 by Creeping Bent
I Shot the President (1997), Marina
Don't Let Your Son Grow Up to Be a Cowboy: Unreleased Recordings 1981-82 (2014), Cherry Red / Creeping Bent
Blood Is Sweeter Than Honey (2019), Creeping Bent

Singles
"Show Me the Door" (1983), Rough Trade - UK Indie No. 35
"Pressing On" (1985), Stampede
"Here Comes That Feeling" (1997), Marina

Compilation appearances
Clear Cut 5 (1983), Japan/Rough Trade: "Once More with Feeling"
Clear Cut Final (1986), Japan Record: "Sixteen Reasons"
Fruitcakes and Furry Collars (1986), Record Mirror: "Pressing On"
New Voices Vol. 14 (1997), Rolling Stone: "Here Comes That Feeling"
Bentboutique: Chasing the Chimera (2000), Creeping Bent: "Heartbeat"
Ave Marina (2004), Marina: "Here Comes That Feeling"
Messthetics #105 (2008), Hyped 2 Death: "Blue Moon Over Hawaii"
Park Lane Archives (2009), Jungle: "Sixteen Reasons"

References

Scottish pop music groups
Musical groups from Glasgow
Scottish new wave musical groups